Francois Peron National Park is a national park on the Peron Peninsula in Western Australia, 726 km north of Perth, and located within the boundary of the Shark Bay World Heritage area.

Names and earlier uses
Aboriginal Australians were the initial inhabitants of the area and have been living there for over 26,000 years. The local peoples who speak the Malgana language call the area Wulyibidi.

It is named after the French naturalist and explorer François Péron who was the zoologist aboard Nicolas Baudin's 1801 and 1803 scientific expeditions to Western Australia, and is situated within the bounds of the earlier pastoral lease of the Peron Station.

Locations from the French exploration era include:
 Guichenault (east coast of the Peron Peninsula)
 Cape Lesueur (west coast of the Peron Peninsula)
 Lake Montbazin

A pearling camp was established on the peninsula at Herald Bight in the 1880s and the remains of the shells can still be found along the beach.

Used as a sheep station from the early 1900s onwards the station was sold to the state government in 1990.

It was gazetted on 8 January 1993 as a National Park – through the purchase of Peron Station (Pastoral Lease 3114/761) in 1990.

Location
It is adjacent to and surrounded by the Shark Bay Marine Park to the west, north and east, and by the Denham to Monkey Mia road to the south.

Facilities
Picnic, boat launching and camping areas along the west coast of the Peninsula include:
 Big Lagoon
 Cape Lesueur
 Cattle Well
 South Gregories
 Gregories
 Bottle Bay

See also
 List of protected areas of Western Australia
 Denham, Western Australia
 Monkey Mia

References

Further reading
 Edward Duyker François Péron: An Impetuous Life: Naturalist and Voyager, Miegunyah/MUP, Melb., 2006, pp. 349,  [winner Frank Broeze Maritime History Prize, 2007].

External links

 Francois Peron National Park page at the Department of Parks and Wildlife website
 Francois Peron National Park page at SharkBay.org
 Francois Peron National Park page at the Shire of Shark Bay website

National parks of Western Australia
Shark Bay
Protected areas established in 1993